The regenerative loop antenna can consist of a tuned signal winding on an open X frame with a feed back winding in close proximity.  High effective gain is achieved, for example by placing this feedback winding in the drain circuit of a JFET (junction field effect transistor).  An antenna of this type employing vacuum tubes was constructed by Vladimir Zworykin in the 1920s.

Sources
 ARRL publication QEX, January/February 2007, pages 45–46.

External links
 billyoungradio.com: A Regenerative Loop Antenna

Radio frequency antenna types
Antennas (radio)